The dalle Carceri were a noble family of Verona and Frankish Negroponte (modern Euboea) from the 12th to the 14th century.

They came to Greece with the Fourth Crusade (1202). After being found guilty of the murder of Mastino della Scala in 1277, the dalle Carceri were banished from Verona.

 Giberto dalle Carceri, Triarch of Negroponte 1205–1209
 Ravano dalle Carceri, Triarch 1209–1216
 Isabel dalle Carceri, widow of Ravano, Triarch 1216–1220
 Rizzardo dalle Carceri (or Ricardo), son of Ravano, Triarch 1216–1220
 Merino I dalle Carceri (or Marino), ruled 1216–1255, son of Ravano
 Bertha dalle Carceri, daughter of Ravano
 Guglielmo I dalle Carceri, Triarch 1255–1263
 Carintana dalle Carceri, Triarch, wife of William II of Villehardouin
 Narzotto dalle Carceri, Triarch
 Grapella dalle Carceri, Triarch 1262–1264
 Guglielmo II dalle Carceri, Triarch 1263–1275
 Marino II dalle Carceri, Triarch 1264–1278
 Giberto II dalle Carceri, Triarch 1275–1279
 Alice dalle Carceri (Alix), wife of George I Ghisi, granddaughter of Ravano
 Maria dalle Carceri, Marchioness of Bodonitsa
 Peter dalle Carceri (Pietro), Triarch of Negroponte and Baron of Arcadia
 Giovanni dalle Carceri, son of Pietro, Lord of Negroponte 1340–1359
 Nicholas III dalle Carceri (Niccolò), Duke of the Archipelago and Lord of Negroponte 1359–1383

Bibliography

 James Rennell Rodd, The Princes of Achaia and the Chronicles of Morea: A Study of Greece in the Middle Ages, two volumes, London, 1907 full text
 "List of Rulers", Frankokratia project 

 
Italian noble families
Frankokratia